is a Japanese former cyclist. He competed at the 1972 Summer Olympics and 1976 Summer Olympics.

References

External links
 

1953 births
Living people
Japanese male cyclists
Olympic cyclists of Japan
Cyclists at the 1972 Summer Olympics
Cyclists at the 1976 Summer Olympics
Sportspeople from Osaka Prefecture
Asian Games medalists in cycling
Cyclists at the 1978 Asian Games
Medalists at the 1978 Asian Games
Asian Games gold medalists for Japan
20th-century Japanese people